BULL was the student magazine of the University of Sydney in Sydney, Australia, and was published by the University of Sydney Union. Established as The Bulletin, then The Bull, BULL was the union's only high-gloss magazine and was published monthly by an editorially independent student team.

Written by students, for students, editorial leadership changed annually and as a result, editions changed tone and style over the years. In 2013 BULL was awarded at the ACUMA Awards for Excellence in Campus Service, receiving Best Publication. BULL had a strong focus on feature articles, culture and arts and involved fellow student reporters, contributors and photographers enriching the magazine. In 2015 the readership of the magazine dropped dramatically which eventually led to the closure of BULL that year.

In early 2016, it was officially reported that BULL would be discontinued with print versions and the website shutting down, and a new online platform, later titled Pulp, would take its place, edited by student journalists Whitney Duan and Aparna Balakumar.

History
Originally published daily as The Bulletin, then The Bull, the Union Recorder was the main monthly student publication at the University of Sydney prior to BULL. However, due to rationalisation in the face of voluntary student unionism, it was announced that in 2006, BULL would be the primary repository of student content and feature student editors.

Since 2006, BULL has been wholly staffed and operated by University of Sydney students, with eight editions published a year.

In 2013 BULL was awarded at the ACUMA Awards for Excellence in Campus Service, receiving Best Publication, among other awards given to the University of Sydney Union at the ceremony.

In March 2014, Honi Soit reported that a proposal was made to the University of Sydney Union student-appointed board of directors to take BULL exclusively online. While the decision was unanimous among the editors, the current Board, who have power over the Union's operations, struck down the proposal, leaving the publication in print. BULL faced a review as a result. Rather the editors of this year pursued with establishing a BULL online platform and radio program that was later discontinued.

2015 saw the magazine readership decline severely and lead to a reduction in circulation.

Content
Content of BULL was all written by students of any degree and contributors were encouraged to write throughout the year. In 2014, BULL began a collective of reporters from applicants to be regular writers for the publication, which continued through to 2015. The topics explored in BULL varied year to year in line with the priorities and beliefs of the editors. Each edition contained an editorial, feature articles, interviews, travel and cultural articles and reviews. Student photography and comics were often printed by the magazine, but did not appear in every issue. BULL had no political alignment and is distanced from the agenda of student representatives, though many editors later went on to run for election as editors of Honi Soit as part of the Students' Representative Council.

Features
As a cultural magazine, BULL had explored current and cutting edge topics over the years. Some feature articles concepts had included dying on social media, disabled sex, being gay in Canberra, the art of "picking up", slash fiction, eating competitions, Asian blepharoplasty, over-the-counter medicine addiction, the Pink Panthers, sex over 60, firestarters, Shakespeare and Company, cat obsessions, stuttering and the rise of King Hits in Australia.

The front cover of Issue 5 in 2013 was particularly controversial for depicting a cartoon penis dressed as a member of the Ku Klux Klan, for the accompanying article "Getting Racy", by Flora Grant and Lawrence Muskitta, on sexual racism.

Interviews
BULL had interviewed a number of notable Australian and international people. This has included Anna Funder, Jasper Knight and Andrew Hansen.

Closure
In early 2016, it was announced that BULL would be discontinued and replaced with a new online platform.

In February, it was announced that this platform would be titled Pulp and would have two editors paying student contributors for their articles on the website, rather than unpaid contributions as had occurred in the past and occurs with newspaper Honi Soit. Likewise students were to be paid salaries in the place of bursaries that had become commonplace in student positions across the university campus.

The new editors for Pulp in 2016 were announced as Whitney Duan and Aparna Balakumar, with the latter later replaced with Swetha Das.

See also
 Honi Soit

References

External links
BULL at the University of Sydney Union

Monthly magazines published in Australia
Defunct magazines published in Australia
Eight times annually magazines
Magazines established in 2006
Magazines disestablished in 2016
Magazines published in Sydney
Student magazines